Socialist Party of Peru (in Spanish: Partido Socialista del Perú) was a political party in Peru.  It was founded in 1930 by Luciano Castillo Colonna, through a split in the Peruvian Communist Party. The party dissolved in 1995.

References

Defunct political parties in Peru
Political parties established in 1930
Socialist parties in Peru